The 1967–68 season was Fussball Club Basel 1893's 74th season since their foundation. It was their 22nd consecutive season in the top flight of Swiss football following their promotion the season 1945–46. They played their home games in the St. Jakob Stadium. The Chairman of the board was Harry Thommen for the second consecutive year.

Overview

Pre-season
Helmut Benthaus was the club player-manager for the third consecutive season. He and his team were the defending league champions. There were no big amaêndments to the squad, one reserve goalkeeper left and one reserve goalkeeper advanced to them and defender Manfred Schädler joined from local club FC Birsfelden and striker Dieter Rüefli joined from Winterthur. Basel played a total of 42 matches in this season. 26 of these games were in the domestic league, two were in the Swiss Cup, two were in the European Cup, five were in the Cup of the Alps and seven were friendly matches. Of these seven test games five were won and two ended with a draw.

Domestic league
There were 14 teams contesting in the 1967–68 Nationalliga A. These were the top 12 teams from the previous 1966–67 season and the two newly promoted teams Luzern and Bellinzona. Basel, as reigning champions, played a mediocre season. Although they were within reach of the table top all the time, they messed everything up towards the end of the season as they lost five games out of seven. Therefore they finished the season in fifth position. They were seven points behind the trio Zürich, Grasshopper Club and Lugano who all ended the season with 38 points. These three team then had to play a championship play-off round and Zürich won both games and became champions. Basel won 13 of the league 26 games, drawing five, losing eight times, and they scored 49 goals conceding 33. The trio Roberto Frigerio, Helmut Hauser and Dieter Rüefli were the team's top goal scorers in the domestic league, each netted nine times.

Swiss Cup
In the Swiss Cup Basel started in the round of 32 with a home match against lower classed FC Le Locle. But the game had to go into overtime. After Le Locle took the lead just after half time break, Frigerio netted the equaliser shortly before the end. In the overtime player-manager Helmut Benthaus managed the winning goal. In the next round Basel played an away game against FC Zürich, but were defeated 0–1 and this campaign was ended very quickly.

European Cup
As reigning champions Basel were qualified for the 1967–68 European Cup. In the first round they were drawn against Danish team Hvidovre. The first leg was in the St. Jakob Stadium. Despite an early lead scored by Hauser, the Danes turned the game and won. In the return leg in stadium Idrætsparken in Copenhagen, Hauser again scored the early lead. Again the Dames turned the match and shortly after half time went into a 3–1 lead. This time Basel were fighting against the defeat and drew level at 3–3 but could not manage to score a winning goal, which would have put them through to the next round.

Players 

 
 
 
 
 

 
 
 
 
 
 

 
 
 
 
 
 
 
 
 

 
 

Players who left the squad

Results 
Legend

Friendly matches

Pre-season

Winter break and mid-season

Nationalliga A

League matches

League standings

Swiss Cup

European Cup

First round

Hvidovre won 5–4 on aggregate.

Cup of the Alps

Matches

Final table

See also
 History of FC Basel
 List of FC Basel players
 List of FC Basel seasons

References

Sources 
 Rotblau: Jahrbuch Saison 2015/2016. Publisher: FC Basel Marketing AG. 
 Switzerland 1967–68 at RSSSF
 Cup of the Alps 1967 at RSSSF

External links
 FC Basel official site

FC Basel seasons
Basel